Caspar (or Kaspar) Erasmus Duftschmid was an Austrian naturalist and physician who made significant contributions to entomology, especially  Coleoptera.

He was born in Gmunden on 19 November 1767, and died in Linz on 17 December 1821.

His best-known work, introducing many new genera and species is Fauna Austriaca. Oder Beschreibung der österreischischen Insekten für angehande Freunde der Entomologie, which was published in three volumes (in 1805, 1812, and 1825) at Linz and Leipzig.
His collection of Coleoptera and Lepidoptera from Upper Austria is in Oberösterreiches Landesmuseum - Biologiezentrum The natural history museum of Upper Austria (in German), Linz. The labels are lost, and the insects incorporated into the general collection.

References 
Duméril, C. A. M. C. 1823 [Biographien] Paris; Strasbourg, F. G. Levrault. 
Kusdas, K. & Reichl, E. R. [Hrsg.] 1973: Allgemeines. In Kusdas, R. & Reichl, E. R. [Hrsg.] 1973: Die Schmetterlinge Oberösterreichs. Teil 1: Allgemeines, Tagfalter.  Linz : 1-266 : 1-37.
Mitter, H. 2003: Zur Geschichte der *Käferkunde in Oberösterreich.  Denisia 8 131-137, 7 Abb.

1767 births
1821 deaths
Austrian entomologists
Coleopterists
Austrian naturalists
People from Gmunden
18th-century Austrian physicians
19th-century Austrian physicians